Between extant and gone, there are 82 castles in Sardinia, all built during the Middle Ages. Some date back to the Byzantine period, but most of them were built during the Judicate period and della Gherardesca, Malaspina and Doria rule, especially from the second half of the 13th century onwards.

Built mainly for strategic military purposes, they had the function of guarding the judicial borders and the most important communication routes. With the unification of Sardinia under the Aragonese their importance faded away and over time almost all of them fell into ruin.

List

Bibliography
 

Castles in Sardinia
Sardinia
History of Sardinia